Terapon, also known as the grunters or trumpeters is a genus of ray-finned fish in the family Terapontidae, the grunters.

Its deprecated junior homonym is  Therapon. It was introduced since "Terapon" was perceived as an incorrect rendering of the Greek word therapon. In fact, the intended etymology was  = "strange thing, monster, wonder" (cf. teratosaurus) +  = "marine", pertaining to the sea.

Species
There are three species in the genus Terapon:

 Terapon jarbua Fabricius, 1775 (Jarbua terapon)
 Terapon puta Cuvier, 1829 (Small-scaled terapon)
 Terapon theraps Cuvier, 1829 (Largescaled terapon)

References

 
Taxa named by Georges Cuvier